Barasa is a surname. Notable people with the surname include:

 Didmus Wekesa Barasa, Kenyan politician and military officer 
 George Barasa (born 1990) Kenyan gay activist
 Jonathan Barasa (1916–1996), Kenyan chief 
 Nerijus Barasa (born 1978), Lithuanian footballer
 Violet Barasa (1975–2007), Kenyan volleyball player